The men's 200 metre individual medley at the 1994 World Aquatics Championships took place on 11 September 1994 at Foro Italico in Rome, Italy.

The existing records at the start of the event were:
World record (WR): 1:59.36, Tamás Darnyi (Hungary), 13 January 1991 in Perth, Australia.
Championship record (CR): same as World record

Results

A Final

See also
Swimming at the 1991 World Aquatics Championships – Men's 200 metre individual medley
Swimming at the 1996 Summer Olympics – Men's 200 metre individual medley
Swimming at the 1998 World Aquatics Championships – Men's 200 metre individual medley

References

Individual medley Men 200